South Africa Partners, is a non-profit organization that unlocks the collaborative potential between the United States and South Africa in the areas of health and education. Partners are individuals and/or institutions (academic, professional, business, labor, non-profit, and government). The organization has offices in Boston, MA and Johannesburg, South Africa.

Executive Director, Judy Bigby, is a nationally recognized health policy expert who brings over 30 years’ experience in health care delivery systems reforms, community health program implementation and evaluation, and strategies to achieve health equity. Judy assumed the role of executive director in June 2017. She has been involved with South Africa Partners as a member of the board of advisors and the board of directors for over 15 years. Appointed by Governor Deval Patrick, Judy served as Secretary of Health and Human Services for the Commonwealth of Massachusetts from 2007 to 2012.

Co-founder of South Africa Partners, Mary Tiseo, with Donna Katzin, executive director of Shared Interests, jointly received the first "Siyabonga Friend of South Africa Award" for their individual and organizations contributions. The Siyabonga Awards launched at a gala dinner on 7 October 2014, at the Marriott Marquis hotel on Times Square in New York City.

History
South Africa Partners was established in 1997, because its founders understood that the end of legislated apartheid did not mean the end of its impact on the majority of the population. The organization was founded on the belief that it would take an international effort to create a South Africa that was just and equitable. For over 20 years, the organization has helped partners summon sufficient momentum to propel a solution and up and over the tipping point to sweeping change. The solutions are supported by research and are suitable for low-resourced settings in South Africa. Partnerships include individuals and institutions in areas such as academic, professional, business, labor, non-profit, and government.

Funding
South Africa Partners operates on donations from private and corporate supporters, as well as grant funding from foundations and government.

Board of Directors, Council of Friends, Senior Staff

Board of Directors

Andrew Ainslie: Dean, University of Rochester Simon Business School
David Dolbashian: Vice President, Treasury Services, Eastern Bank : Treasurer
Ellen M. Sullivan: Director, International Advancement, Phillips Academy, Andover
Elmer R. Freeman: Executive Director, Center for Community Health Education Research and Service Inc.
Ilana Hurwitz: Visiting Law Professor, Boston University School of Law  
Joellen Lambiotte: Senior Program Advisor, Jhpiego, an affiliate of Johns Hopkins University
Jonathan Joffe: CEO, QTec Analytics LLC : Board President
Karen Shmukler: Assistant Superintendent of Student Services, Newton Public Schools 
Leora Rajak: Director, Enterpriseroom Pty Ltd.
Mike J. Page: Professor of Finance and Management, Bentley University
Mitalene Fletcher: Director, PreK-12 and International Programs, Professional Education, Harvard Graduate School of Education : President-elect
Nkateko Nyoka: Chief Officer, Vodacom Group
Stephen Moody: Director and Senior Consultant, Boston Trust and Investment Management Company
Lebo McCallum: Analyst, NEPC LLC

Council of Friends

Nana Carmen Ashhurst: Senior Director, Leadership Gifts, Children’s Health Fund; Minister 
Janet Axelrod: President, Wealth Matters LLC  
Douglas Brooks: Senior Director, Community Engagement, Gilead Sciences  
Margaret Burnham: Professor of Law and African American Studies, Northeastern University School of Law 
Jackie Jenkins-Scott: President Emeritus, Wheelock College
Rachel Knight: Doctoral Student at Teachers College/Columbia University 
Jeanette Kruger: Social Worker
Jason Lewis: Legislator, Commonwealth of MA
Lynn Meltzer: President, Research Institute for Learning and Development (ResearchILD)
Susan Cook Merrill: Associate Professor Occupational Therapy, Academic Fieldwork Coordinator School of Health Sciences, MCPHS University 
Colette Phillips: President and CEO, Colette Phillips Communications 
Marita Rivero: Executive Director, Museum of African American History
Consultant
Marti Wilson-Taylor: Executive Consultant, Wilson Taylor Associates, Chair of the Board of Trustees, Hyams Foundation
Linda Kaplan, Tufts Primary Care, Tufts Medical Center

Senior Staff

JudyAnn Bigby : Executive Director
Anthony Diesel : Country Director
Thembi Ngubane-Zungu : Deputy Country Director
Carol Jackson Cashion : Education Program Director
Marisol Mercado : Director of Finance and Administration
Kirsten A. O'Brien : Director of Development

Projects
Projects include:

Strengthening care and support systems for South Africans affected by HIV/AIDS 
Train HIV positive people how to stay healthy.
Providing technical consultants for the pre-antiretroviral Care and Treatment Program.

Supporting South Africa’s youngest children to reach their full educational potential 
Training Preschool teachers to help improve early childhood development program's in informal schools, including nutritional improvement, books and educational materials for sustainability.
Primary schools Program's that expand capacity and professional development of teachers.
Using conversation prompting signage in environments that families and children encounter daily to increase verbal interactions between caregivers and children
Masifunde Sonke: Let Us Read Together Book Program

Increasing the capacity of South Africa’s Leaders 
Training of health leaders and managers in an effort to improve health services, promotion of international research collaborations, and granting hospitals access to newer technologies.

Unlocking the collaborative potential between South Africa and the United States
World Cup Boston 2010: In collaboration with the Barr Foundation, a range of city agencies, NPO's and the local Community. A range of activities and soccer tournaments were arranged in Boston, Seemingly inspired by the World Cup South Africa 2010.

References

External links

South Africa–United States relations
Charities based in Massachusetts
Foreign charities operating in South Africa